The Lucky Number is a 1933 British sports comedy film directed by Anthony Asquith and starring Clifford Mollison, Gordon Harker, Joan Wyndham and Frank Pettingell. The screenplay concerns a professional footballer who attempts to recover a winning pools ticket. The film was made by Gainsborough Pictures and shot at Islington and Welwyn Studios with sets designed by Alex Vetchinsky. The football scenes were filmed in and around Highbury Stadium in North London.

Cast
Clifford Mollison as Percy Gibbs
Gordon Harker as A Hackney Man
Joan Wyndham as Minnie Sullivan
Frank Pettingell as Mr Brown
Joe Hayman as Mr MacDonald
Hetty Hartley as Mrs MacDonald
Esme Percy as Chairman
Hay Petrie as Photographer
Alfred Wellesley as Pickpocket
Wally Patch as Bookmaker

References

Bibliography
Wood, Linda. British Films, 1927-1939. British Film Institute, 1986.

External links

1933 films
Films directed by Anthony Asquith
1930s English-language films
1930s sports comedy films
British sports comedy films
Films set in London
Gainsborough Pictures films
Islington Studios films
Films shot at Welwyn Studios
British association football films
British black-and-white films
Films with screenplays by Franz Schulz
1932 comedy films
1930s British films